Daniel Harvey Judah (born August 8, 1977) is an American former professional boxer. He is the brother of Zab Judah and Josiah Judah, who are also former professional boxers.

Boxing career
Judah had his pro debut on June 18, 1999.

Although Judah has never fought for a major title, he has fought several notable foes, including former Light Heavyweight champ  Glen Johnson (boxer) (Draw), Julian Letterlough (Draw), Elvir Muriqi (Decision Loss), Eric Harding (Decision Loss), and Darnell Wilson (TKO loss).

The TKO loss in 2006 to Wilson was his first KO loss, and occurred after a serious injury. According to ringside reports, "just 33 seconds into round four, a right hand from Wilson landed on the shoulder of Judah, and a cracking sound could be heard at ringside. Judah turned away writhing in pain, his shrieks could be heard throughout the ballroom. Referee Malik Waleed, like many in attendance, seemed miffed by the occurrence, he then summoned the ringside physician to inspect the injured fighter. Judah shrieked as soon as his stiffened arm was touched by Doctor Douglass Frankel, M.D."

He was slated to have shoulder surgery in April 2007.

Family
Judah's father is an avowed Black Hebrew Israelite, though Judah's family have declared themselves "Jews". Judah's brother Zab has been referred to in the press as "the best Jewish fighter of all time."

Professional boxing record

References

External links
 
BoxRec bio
BoxNews info
Boxing-records

Black Hebrew Israelite people
Judah family
1977 births
Sportspeople from Brooklyn
Living people
Boxers from New York City
Light-heavyweight boxers
American male boxers